Qarchak railway station (Persian:ايستگاه راه آهن قرچک, Istgah-e Rah Ahan-e Qarchak) is located in Qarchak, Tehran Province. The station is owned by IRI Railway.

References

External links

Railway stations in Iran